The White Storm, formerly known as The Cartels War is a 2013 Hong Kong-Chinese crime thriller film directed by Benny Chan and starring Sean Lau, Louis Koo, and Nick Cheung. The film had its world premiere at the 2013 Hong Kong Asian Film Festival on 25 October 2013.

A sequel titled The White Storm 2: Drug Lords was released on 16 July 2019, with Koo returning, Andy Lau joining the cast as well as producing and Herman Yau directing.

Plot
Ma Ho-tin, So Kin-chow and Cheung Tsz-wai are good brothers who grew up together. When they grew up, they were stationed in the Narcotics Bureau of the Hong Kong Police Force. Among them, Chow has been undercover for a long time in the drug trafficking group. He can't live a normal life and make him extremely annoyed. Big brother A Tian and his detective brother A Wei often persuade him that he can return to the team after catching the last big drug lord. The high-level police force asked Aqiu to follow up to catch a long line to catch big fish. Chow was deeply dissatisfied. The last three brothers decided to go to Thailand to catch the big poisonous eight-faced Buddha and help Chow to escape. However, due to the safety concerns of Aqiu, he was reluctant to conduct a fake drug transaction with the Eight-faced Buddha. He secretly used the telephone to contact the other party and said that the transaction was cancelled, which led to the suspicion that the Eight-faced Buddha had bought the drug party Aqiu and others. After the war, the two sides forced Ho-tin to choose a rescue between Chow and Cheung. Finally, Ho-tin chose to save Chow, and Cheung was shot in the crocodile pool. Cheung's death made both Ho-tin and Chow deeply saddened. The two also took care of Cheung’s mother who was hospitalized for her illness and amnesia. Aqi’s wife broke up with Aqiu after giving birth to her daughter.

Cast
Sean Lau as Ma Ho-tin
Louis Koo as So Kin-chow
Nick Cheung as Cheung Tsz-wai
Yuan Quan as Chloe Yuan
Lo Hoi-pang as Wei Xin-guang (Eight-Faced Buddha)
Berg Ng as Wong Shun-yik
Ken Lo as Bobby
Treechada Malayaporn as Mina Wei
Ben Lam as Hak Tsai
Hugo Ng as M.D. Wong
Marc Ma as Dune Kun
Xing Yu as Kanit
Law Lan as Tsz-wai's mother
Lee Siu-kei as Kei, informer for Ho-tin
Vithaya Pansringarm as Mr. Choowit
Nut Keasanond as Sanit Wei
Pacharapon Jantieng as Chatchai
Chris Collins as Eight Faced Buddha's Lead Mercenary

Critical response
Andrew Chan of the Film Critics Circle of Australia writes, "The White Storm is easily the most entertaining (Hong Kong) film of the year, an edge of the seat thriller, smash buckling action affair and a powerhouse of acting experience".

Awards and nominations

Sequel

On 16 March 2018, Universe Entertainment announced that a sequel of the film, titled The White Storm 2: Drug Lords, would start shooting during the summer and unveiled its teaser film poster. Being a sequel in name only with a similar thematic but a new storyline, Louis Koo returned playing a different role, making him the only returning cast member. Andy Lau joined the cast and also served as the film's producer, while Herman Yau replaced Benny Chan as the director for the sequel. Filming for The White Storm 2: Drug Lords took place in Hong Kong and the Philippines and the budget of the film was over HK$200 million. Production for The White Storm 2 - Drug Lords began on 23 June 2018 and was released on 16 July 2019.

See also
The White Storm (film series)

References

External links

Hong Kong action thriller films
Chinese action thriller films
Chinese crime thriller films
2013 crime thriller films
Hong Kong crime thriller films
Police detective films
Gun fu films
2010s Cantonese-language films
Films directed by Benny Chan
Films about drugs
Films set in Hong Kong
Films shot in Hong Kong
Films set in Macau
Films shot in Macau
Films set in Thailand
Films shot in Thailand
Films with screenplays by Alan Yuen
2010s Hong Kong films